Oleksandrivka is a village in Kramatorsk Raion in Donetsk Oblast of eastern Ukraine.

References

Villages in Kramatorsk Raion